The Battle of Liscarroll was fought on 3 September 1642 in northern County Cork, Munster, between Catholic Irish insurgents and government troops. The battle was part of the Irish Rebellion, which had started in the north in 1641 reaching Munster in 1642. The insurgents, about 8,500 strong, were led by Garret Barry, an Irish veteran from the Spanish Army of Flanders. The government forces, about 2,400 strong, were commanded by Murrough O'Brien, 6th Baron of Inchiquin, an Irish Protestant. Despite his numerical disadvantage Inchiquin routed his enemies by the strength of his cavalry and the firepower of his musketeers. In October the insurgents founded the Irish Catholic Confederation and the conflict in Munster continued as part of the Irish Confederate Wars.

Background 

Sir Phelim O'Neill launched the Rebellion in northern Ireland in October 1641, exploiting the King's weakness at the eve of the English Civil War. The rebellion spread south reaching Munster early in 1642. In January the Munster insurgents, led by the local Catholic noble Maurice Roche, 8th Viscount Fermoy, attacked the local English Protestant noble Richard Boyle, 1st Earl of Cork, at Youghal. In March and April the Munster insurgents, led by Fermoy and Donough MacCarty, 2nd Viscount Muskerry, besieged Cork City, but Murrough O'Brien, 6th Baron of Inchiquin, an Irish Protestant, counterattacked and drove the insurgents away. The Munster insurgents then gave the command of their army to Garret Barry, an Irish veteran from the Spanish Army of Flanders. In May and June Barry besieged and took Limerick. The insurgents also attacked castles given to English settlers during the Plantation of Munster. In summer 1642 the Munster insurgents attacked the castles of Sir Philip Perceval, an English knight. Muskerry took Annagh Castle, County Tipperary, and in August besieged Liscarroll Castle, northern County Cork. The castle surrendered on 2 September. The next day Inchiquin with his army appeared before the castle, too late to save the castle but ready for battle.

The battle 

The Insurgents' army consisted of militia raised by the local Catholic lords. The insurgents' cavalry was led by Oliver Stephenson, who descended from Elizabethan English settlers but sided with the insurgents as he was Catholic.

The government force consisted of three English regiments and various local Protestant troops. The three English regiments had been sent to Ireland in February or early March 1642 to reinforce the army of Sir William St Leger, president of Munster. The first such regiment was commanded by Charles Vavasour, 1st Baronet, of Killingthorpe who landed with his regiment in Youghal in February Vavasour commanded the foot whereas Inchiquin was commander-in-chief and commanded the horse. Together they pursued the Irish when they finally fled.

The three eldest sons of the 1st Earl of Cork fought in the cavalry at the battle. They were: Richard Boyle, Viscount Dungarvan; Lewis, Viscount Boyle of Kinalmeaky; and Roger Boyle, Baron Broghill. Kinalmeaky was killed and succeeded by his elder brother as 2nd Viscount Kinalmeakey according to the special remainder of his title.

Stephenson's horsemen charged Inchiquin's force, putting them into disorder and even capturing Inchiquin himself. However, in the melee, Stephenson was shot dead by Inchiquin's brother (through the eye-piece of his helmet) and the Irish cavalry lost heart and fell back. The Irish infantry lacked the training and discipline to stand up to a cavalry charge and fled, leading to a rout of the Irish forces. The vast difference in the number of muskets was a major factor in the defeat of the Irish, some 1500 against 500. Most Irishmen wore pikes.

The next day Inchiquin with his army appeared before the castle. Despite inferior numbers the royalists defeated the insurgents under General Garret Barry in the ensuing Battle of Liscarroll. Muskerry allegedly panicked, fled, and caused others to flee. His Protestant acquaintance Barrymore died in September, supposedly of wounds received in the battle.

Casualties and consequences 

About 600 Irish Confederates were killed, among them a high proportion of officers like Stephenson. The local Catholic gentry were decimated by the battle, for instance the Fitzgerald family of the House of Desmond had 18 of their members killed. They were buried in a mass grave just outside Liscarroll. In addition, Inchiquin executed 50 more Confederate officers whom he had taken prisoner, hanging them the next morning. The battle meant that south central County Cork with the towns of Cork City, Bandon, Kinsale and Youghal would form an English and Protestant stronghold for the rest of the war.

Notes, citations, and sources

Notes

Citations

Sources 

 – Online edition

 – 1642 to 1660

 – 1602 and later

 – Parliaments & Biographies (PDF downloadable from given URL)

 – (Preview)
 – (Preview)
 – History

1642 in Ireland
Liscarroll
Liscarroll
Liscarroll
Liscarroll
Liscarroll